Nikita Yevgenyevich Kokarev (born 8 January 2003) is a Russian football player. He plays for FC Krasnodar.

Club career
He made his debut in the Russian Football National League for FC Krasnodar-2 on 13 October 2021 in a game against FC Torpedo Moscow.

References

External links
 
 
 Profile by Russian Football National League

2003 births
Living people
Russian footballers
Russia youth international footballers
Association football goalkeepers
FC Krasnodar-2 players
FC Rotor Volgograd players
Russian First League players
Russian Second League players